Apple Studios is an American film and television production company that is a subsidiary of Apple Inc. It specializes in developing and producing television series and films for Apple's digital video streaming service Apple TV+.

History 
In October 2019, The Hollywood Reporter reported that Apple Inc. was launching its own production company, overseen by Zack Van Amburg and Jamie Erlicht, to produce original television and film content for Apple TV+.

Productions

Film

Television

References 

Apple Inc. subsidiaries
Apple TV+
Film production companies of the United States
Television production companies of the United States